Jacobus Petrus van Wyk (born 22 January 1992 in Nababeep) is a South African rugby player for Italian team Zebre Parma in United Rugby Championship.  His regular position is centre or wing.

Career

Youth

He represented Western Province at the Under-18 Craven Week competition in 2010. Later in the same year, he was also included in the  squad and made one appearance in the 2011 Under-19 Provincial Championship. In 2011, he made nine starts in the same competition, scoring five tries. In 2012 and 2013, he played for the  side, weighing in with four tries in each of those competitions.

Western Province / Stormers

Bordeaux

In August 2016, French Top 14 side  announced that they signed Van Wyk as a medical joker to replace the injured Darly Domvo. The deal would see Van Wyk arrive on a five-month deal until January 2017.

Leicester Tigers
On 20 July 2020, van Wyk signed for Leicester Tigers in England's Premiership Rugby from the 2020-21 season.  After 18 appearances across two season's he was released from the club with immediate effect on 31 March 2022.

Zebre Parma
On 6 July 2022 van Wyk signed for Zebre Parma in the United Rugby Championship.

Representative rugby

Van Wyk was a late call-up to the South Africa Under-20 side during the 2012 IRB Junior World Championship held in South Africa, replacing Patrick Howard who suffered a hamstring injury during the tournament. He only made one appearance – starting the final against New Zealand, which South Africa won 22–16.

References

1992 births
Living people
People from Nama Khoi Local Municipality
Afrikaner people
South African people of Dutch descent
South African rugby union players
Stormers players
Western Province (rugby union) players
Rugby union wings
Rugby union centres
Alumni of Paarl Gimnasium
South Africa Under-20 international rugby union players
Leicester Tigers players
Union Bordeaux Bègles players
Sharks (rugby union) players
Sharks (Currie Cup) players
Hurricanes (rugby union) players
Rugby union players from the Northern Cape
Zebre Parma players